The R765 road (also known as the Newtown Road or the Roundwood Road) is a regional road in Ireland joining the villages of Roundwood and Newtownmountkennedy in County Wicklow. 

The road is 10km long.

Route
The road starts eastwards at a junction with the R755 in the village of Roundwood and terminates in Newtownmountkennedy at the R772 (the former N11 national primary road).

See also
Roads in Ireland
National primary road
National secondary road

References
Roads Act 1993 (Classification of Regional Roads) Order 2006 – Department of Transport

Regional roads in the Republic of Ireland
Roads in County Wicklow